D. Jeffrey Mims is a painter, educator, lecturer, and muralist working as a classical realist.

Biography 
Mims attended the Rhode Island School of Design (1972 - 1973) and the Pennsylvania Academy of the Fine Arts(1973 - 1976). In 1976, he received an Elizabeth Greenshields Foundation grant to support independent study in the museums of England, France, and Italy and in 1981 returned to Florence, Italy where he studied with the American painter Benjamin F. Long and received critiques from Long's Italian mentor, Pietro Annigoni. For over a decade, he maintained studios in Italy and the US, during which time he executed both easel and public mural paintings. In recognition for his work in traditional fresco painting, Classical America presented Mims with an Arthur Ross Award in 1984 for ‘excellence and integrity in the application of classical ideals’. He was awarded an Affiliated Fellowship at the American Academy in Rome in 2009 from The Institute of Classical Architecture and Art. Mims has lectured on historic collaborations between artists and architects for, among other organizations, the ICAA and the University of Notre Dame.  In recognition of his work with the Academy of Classical Design, the ICAA Southeast awarded Mims the first ever Shutze Award for Pedagogy in 2020 at its annual ceremony in Atlanta. In 2021 Mims was invited to participate in a live-streamed symposium titled, ‘After Raphael’ which was co-sponsored by the University of Notre Dame School of Architecture, The Rome Global Gateway, the Nanovic Institute for European Studies, and the American Academy in Rome.

Academy

D. Jeffrey Mims is founder and director of the Academy of Classical Design in Southern Pines, North Carolina. The Academy is a school of fine art with an emphasis on traditional mural painting and architectural decoration. The school began as Mims Studios in 2000 and was re-structured in 2011 as the Academy of Classical Design. As of 2023 the Academy will be temporarily closed for a period of two years to allow for the completion of the painted ceiling decorations. Updates will be posted to the Instagram account @academyofclassicaldesign.

Selected writings
2016 "Creating a Classical Academy" Traditional Building Magazine. April 2016.
2010 "Caput Mundi (Capital of the World)" Fine Art Connoisseur.  July 2010.  pp. 41 – 44 
2006 "Slow Painting / A Deliberate Renaissance" Oglethorpe University Museum, Atlanta, Georgia—catalogue with contributed essay.

Awards

 1976 - Elizabeth T. Greenshields Foundation grant
 1984 - Classical America - Arthur Ross Award
 2009 - The Institute of Classical Architecture and Classical America - Alma Schapiro Prize - Fellowship at the American Academy in Rome
2020 - ICAA Southeast – Philip Trammell Shutze Award for Pedagogy

Bibliography 
 Figueroa, Raphael, "Peter and John Heal a Man Who Was Lame, Magic City Religion, November 22, 2020. 
D. Jeffrey Mims, "Caput Mundi (Capital of the World)," Fine Art Connoisseur, August 2010, vol. 7, i. 4, pp. 41–44, and cover illustration.
 Peter Bougie, "Intuition: An Interview with D. Jeffrey Mims," Classical Realism Journal, vol.VII, i.1, pp. 10–19, 10-19 illustration.
 Jerry Cullum, "Realism Lives In Contemporary Pieces," The Atlanta Journal-Constitution, Friday, November 10, 1995, Section P pp. 1, 12 illustration.
 Anderson, Kurt, "An Interview with D. Jeffrey Mims," Classical Realism Quarterly, May 16, 1990, pp. 12–15, 20-21 illustration.
 Keough, Patrick, "Reinventing Classical Realism," The Arts Journal, May 1990 pp. 14–15 illustration.
 Bretzius, Hunter, "Renaissance Man," Sun Journal, Thursday, April 5, 1990, pp. 1C-2 illustration.
 Nunnelley, William A., "Painting in the Old Way," Seasons, Fall 1988 pp. 8–9 illustration.
 Reeves, Garland, "Jeffrey Mims: An Artist Who Takes Long View of Things," The Birmingham News, Sunday August 21, 1988 p. 1E-7 illustration.
 Lauder, Val, "The Southern Artists," Southern Accents, Nov.-Dec. 1986 pp. 120–123, 146 illustration.
 Coles, William A., "D. Jeffrey Mims: A Painter's Odyssey," American Artist, October 1985 pp. 36–40, 78-82 illustration.

References

External links
 Academy of Classical Design Website
 "Caput Mundi; The Capital of the World" pdf Feature Article in Fine Art Connoisseur
 Alma Schapiro Award Page at the Institute of Classical Architecture and Classical America
 The Church of the Frescoes
 Oglethorpe University Museum of Art, Co-Curator, "Slow Painting, A Deliberate Renaissance"
 Architects and Artisans, "'Pure Ornament' on Exhibit in Charleston"
 "Creating a Classical Academy" pdf Traditional Building Magazine

20th-century American painters
American male painters
21st-century American painters
New Classical architecture
Artists from North Carolina
Living people
1954 births
Rhode Island School of Design alumni
Pennsylvania Academy of the Fine Arts alumni
20th-century American male artists